Potamides is a genus of prehistoric sea snails, marine gastropod mollusks in the family Potamididae.

Species

Species within the genus Potamides include:
 † Potamides archiaci Halder & Sinha, 2014
 † Potamides crassituberosus Cossmann & Pissarro, 1902 
 † Potamides durranus Iqbal, 1969
 † Potamides isabenense Dominici & Kowalke, 2014
 † Potamides lamarckii Brongniart, 1810
 † Potamides matsoni Dall, 1913 
 † Potamides migralis
 † Potamides pascoei Cox, 1931
 † Potamides tricarinatus 
 and other extinct taxa

Synonyms:
 Potamides conicus (Blainville, 1829) is a synonym of extant species Pirenella conica (Blainville, 1829)

Fossil record
Fossils of Potamides are found in marine strata from the Permian to the Quaternary(age range: from 265.0 to 1.806 million years ago.).  Fossils are known from many localities in Europe, Indonesia, Africa, North America, South America, Pakistan, Japan and Cambodia.

References

External links

Potamididae
Prehistoric gastropods